Stephen Namanya is an Anglican bishop in Uganda: he has been  Bishop of North Ankole since 2015.

Namanya was born on June 2, 1959 at Kabuyanda, Isingiro District and educated at Uganda Christian University. He was ordained a deacon in 1987, and  a priest in 1988. He has served as a parish priest; an archdeacon; and as Chairperson of the House of Clergy for North Ankole Diocese. Namanya was consecrated  on 2 August 2015 at Emmanuel Cathedral, Rushere.

References

Anglican bishops of North Ankole
21st-century Anglican bishops in Uganda
Living people
People from Isingiro District
Uganda Christian University alumni
Anglican archdeacons in Africa
Year of birth missing (living people)